In the run up to the 2019 Spanish local elections, various organizations carried out opinion polling to gauge voting intention in local entities in Spain. The results of such polls for municipalities in the Community of Madrid are displayed in this article. The date range for these opinion polls is from the previous local elections, held on 24 May 2015, to the day the next elections were held, on 26 May 2019.

Polls are listed in reverse chronological order, showing the most recent first and using the dates when the survey fieldwork was done, as opposed to the date of publication, except where the fieldwork dates are unknown. The highest percentage figure in each polling survey is displayed with its background shaded in the leading party's colour. If a tie ensues, this is applied to the figures with the highest percentages. The "Lead" columns on the right shows the percentage-point difference between the parties with the highest percentages in a given poll.

Municipalities

Alcalá de Henares

Alcobendas

Alcorcón

Arganda del Rey

Ciempozuelos

Coslada

Fuenlabrada

Getafe

Leganés

Madrid

Móstoles

Paracuellos de Jarama

Parla

Pinto

Pozuelo de Alarcón

San Fernando de Henares

Torrejón de Ardoz

Velilla de San Antonio

Notes

References

Madrid
2019